Grierson may refer to:

Clan Grierson, a Scottish clan
Grierson (name), a surname (including a list of people with the name)
Grierson (film), a 1973 Canadian documentary
Grierson, a GWR 3031 Class steam locomotive of the Great Western Railway

See also
Grierson's Raid, an 1863 Union cavalry raid during the Vicksburg Campaign of the American Civil War
Grierson Spring (Texas), in Reagan County
Grierson Awards, a British documentary film award